"Bounce Along" is a reggae fusion song recorded by Jamaican singer Wayne Wonder. The song was written by Steven Marsden and V.W. Charles and Paul Edmund and produced by Marsden. It was included on Wonder's 2003 studio album No Holding Back and was released as the second single from the album. The single was released in October 2003 and charted at a peak position of number nineteen in the United Kingdom.

Music video
The music video was directed by Kevin DeFreitas and premiered in mid-2003.

Chart performance

References

2003 singles
Wayne Wonder songs
Songs written by Steven "Lenky" Marsden
Song recordings produced by Steven "Lenky" Marsden